Trond Granlund (born in Oslo, Norway on 29 July 1950) is a Norwegian rock and folk singer, composer and guitarist.

Granlund grew up on Torshov and Manglerud in Oslo, and has lived in Lørenskog since 1968. Granlund started performing in 1973 releasing the independent Rock album. He released his debut solo self-titled album Trond Granlund in 1976 and has been prolific in releasing of albums. Until the mid-1990s, most output by Granlund was in English, but with the album Tida er'e ingen som kan snu in 1995, he started to release albums almost exclusively in Norwegian.

His autobiographical album På vei til rock 'n roll (meaning On the road to rock'n'roll) was released in 2001. An autobiographical book was published in 2012 titled and his next book coming time, the Council in 2007. [Needs updating] In 2012 he published his book Sanger jeg lærte av mamma og pappa (meaning Songs I learned from my mom and dad).
he is married and have 4 Children (1Daughter & 3 Boys)

Awards
1981: Norwegian Grammy in "pop category" for Pleasant Surprise
1985: "Gammleng Award" in "pop category"

Discography

Albums
Studio albums
1973: Rock
1976: Granlund
1977: Utstøtt
1978: Made in Manchester
1979: Starstruck
1980: Eloise (NOR #13)
1981: Pleasant Surprise (NOR #2)
1982: Stay the Night (NOR #12)
1983: Driftin''' (NOR #11)
1985: Hearts in Danger (NOR #20)
1986: The Ride1989: Promise the Moon1990: Roots1992: Pleasure and Tears1993: I Can't Quit Now1995: Tida er'e ingen som kan snu1997: Bilder inni hue2000: Østkantfolk2002: På vei til rock'n'roll2005: En litt forvirra fyr2007: Kommer tid, kommer råd2010: Sanger jeg lærte av faren min (NOR #14)
2012: Bror min og jeg (NOR #36)

Live
2012: En rønner fra Manglerud – Live fra NRK Studio 19 (NOR #30)

Compilations
1998: Fra Manglerud til Manchester 1973–19982003: Høyt, lavt og langt''

Singles

References

External links

Trond Granlund

Norwegian male singers
Norwegian songwriters
Norwegian rock musicians
Melodi Grand Prix contestants
Spellemannprisen winners
1950 births
Living people
People from Lørenskog
Musicians from Oslo